Ropa is a village in the Hamirpur District of north Indian state Himachal Pradesh.the googa mandir is present here.

References

Villages in Hamirpur district, Himachal Pradesh